Gurko is a surname. Notable people with the surname include:

 Iosif Gurko (1828–1901), Russian field marshal
 Leo Gurko (1914–2008), Polish-American author
 Vasily Gurko (1864–1937), Russian army officer
 Vladimir Gurko (1862–1927), Russian government official